Leeston (Māori: Karumata) is a town on the Canterbury Plains in the South Island of New Zealand. It is located 30 kilometres southwest of Christchurch, between the shore of Lake Ellesmere / Te Waihora and the mouth of the Rakaia River. The town is home to a growing number of services which have increased and diversified along with the population. Leeston has a supermarket, schools (pre-school, primary school and high school), churches, hospital (for the elderly only), gym, cafes, restaurants, medical centre, pharmacy and post office. The Selwyn District Council currently has a service office in Leeston, after the headquarters was shifted to Rolleston.

Demographics 

Leeston had a population of 2,208 at the 2018 New Zealand census, an increase of 669 people (43.5%) since the 2013 census, and an increase of 882 people (66.5%) since the 2006 census. There were 828 households. There were 1,083 males and 1,128 females, giving a sex ratio of 0.96 males per female. The median age was 39.3 years (compared with 37.4 years nationally), with 498 people (22.6%) aged under 15 years, 327 (14.8%) aged 15 to 29, 990 (44.8%) aged 30 to 64, and 390 (17.7%) aged 65 or older.

Ethnicities were 92.7% European/Pākehā, 9.9% Māori, 0.8% Pacific peoples, 2.0% Asian, and 2.4% other ethnicities (totals add to more than 100% since people could identify with multiple ethnicities).

The proportion of people born overseas was 15.2%, compared with 27.1% nationally.

Although some people objected to giving their religion, 54.5% had no religion, 35.1% were Christian, 0.1% were Hindu, 0.3% were Muslim, 0.1% were Buddhist and 2.2% had other religions.

Of those at least 15 years old, 240 (14.0%) people had a bachelor or higher degree, and 402 (23.5%) people had no formal qualifications. The median income was $37,400, compared with $31,800 nationally. The employment status of those at least 15 was that 927 (54.2%) people were employed full-time, 243 (14.2%) were part-time, and 42 (2.5%) were unemployed.

Leisure and entertainment

Harts Creek 
Harts creek is a spring-fed creek and wildlife reserve located 7 minutes drive from Leeston and is a popular place for short walks, picnics, fly fishing and bird watching. Restoration projects have resulted in a wildlife reserve with some of the clearest waters in the Ellesmere District.

Bird life includes:
 mute swans
 black swans
 pūkeko
 parekareka/spotted shag
 Canada geese
 several species of duck
 kōtuku/white heron
 kakī/pied stilts
 kamana/crested grebe
 matuku/Australasian bittern

Ellesmere A&P Show 

The Ellesmere A&P show is currently in its 147th year. It is held annually at the Leeston Agricultural and Pastoral Showgrounds. It is typically held in October and is one of the Selwyn Districts biggest events, attracting tens of thousands of visitors each year. Typical attractions include: farmyard displays, photography displays, craft stalls, sheep and wool displays, horse showing and jumping, dairy and beef cattle, wood chopping, trade displays, live music, vintage and modern machinery, dog trials, face painting, pony rides, shearing competitions,  fair-ground rides, wine tasting, wearable arts and many more.

Camping 
The Leeston District is home to three campsites, two situated on the banks of the Selwyn River, and one on the shores of Lake Ellesmere.

 Coes Ford Camp Ground: Camping is permitted for a maximum of 28 days and is free of charge. Coes Ford is a good spot for camping, fishing, picnics, casual recreation and conservation. Toilets are available but there is no drinking water. Coes Ford is available for camping all year round.
 Chamberlains Ford Camp Ground: This is a Selwyn District Council designated camping ground. Camping here is free – has a good waterhole for swimming. Toilets are available but there is no drinking water. Chamberlains Ford Camp Ground is available for camping all year round.
 Lakeside Domain Camp Ground: This camp site is situated on the shores of Lake Ellesmere, New Zealand's 5th largest lake. A good spot for bird watching and recreational water sports. This is a free camp ground.  Toilets are available but there is no drinking water.

Other activities 
In May 2017, a community art gallery was opened in Leeston. It is Leeston's first art gallery.

Leeston is home to a variety of different sporting clubs and has a weekly running club each Wednesday evening. Sporting clubs in Leeston include: Rugby, Netball, Tennis, Lawn Bowls, Soccer, Cricket and Running. Leeston also has a fully equipped gym, which is open seven days a week from 4 a.m. to 11 p.m.

Schools 
Ellesmere College is a co-educational secondary school catering for years 7 to 13. It has a roll of  students as of  The school opened in 1981 to replace Southbridge District High School.

Leeston Consolidated School is a co-educational contributing primary school catering for years 1 to 6. It has a roll of  students ( It opened in 1865, and gained the name "Consolidated" in recognition of primary schools in Lakeside, Irwell, Doyleston and Brookside with which it amalgamated in the 1930s.

References

External links 

 Selwyn District Council page on Leeston

Populated places in Canterbury, New Zealand
Selwyn District